Killswitch Engage is an American metalcore band. It may also refer to two albums by that band: 

Killswitch Engage (2000 album), the debut self-titled album
Killswitch Engage (2009 album), the self-titled fifth album